Cascada de Texolo is a waterfall of eastern Mexico.

There is a bridge over the gorge connecting the dense woodland together. On the other side there are two smaller waterfalls that can be seen from some of the footpaths in the area.

Film appearances
The falls and the surrounding area have been used in several movies, including Romancing The Stone and Clear And Present Danger. In Romancing The Stone, the jewel is hidden in a cave behind a waterfall and Texolo Waterfall was used for that scene.

References

External links
View videos at YouTube

Waterfalls of Mexico
Ramsar sites in Mexico
Landforms of Veracruz
Xalapa
Plunge waterfalls